EPPC may stand for:

 Environmental Planning and Protection Committee, a body of the Canadian Council of Ministers of the Environment
 Ericsson Portable PC
 Ethics and Public Policy Center
 Exhaust pulse pressure charging